Halcuriidae is a family of sea anemones belonging to the order Actiniaria.

Genera:
 Carlgrenia Stephenson, 1918
 Halcurias McMurrich, 1893

References

Actinernoidea
Cnidarian families